VRDBA, VRDB Agar, or Violet Red Bile Dextrose Agar, is a microbiological growth medium. It can be used in agar plates to monitor or assess bacterial growth in the laboratory, particularly the growth of Enterobacteriaceae, for which it is selective.

References

Microbiological media